Dame Marie Roslyn Bashir  (born 1 December 1930) is the former and second longest-serving Governor of New South Wales. Born in Narrandera, New South Wales, Bashir graduated from the University of Sydney in 1956 and held various medical positions, with a particular emphasis in psychiatry. In 1993 Bashir was appointed the Clinical Director of Mental Health Services for the Central Sydney Area Health Service, a position she held until appointed governor on 1 March 2001. She has also served as the Chancellor of the University of Sydney (2007–2012).

Bashir retired on 1 October 2014 and was succeeded as governor by General David Hurley.

Early life and education
Marie Roslyn Bashir was born in 1930 in Narrandera, New South Wales, to Lebanese parents Michael Bashir and Victoria Melick. Her father and her paternal uncle were both medical graduates from the American University of Beirut. Her maternal family had come to Australia in the 19th century.

Bashir attended Narrandera Public School and in 1943 enrolled at Sydney Girls High School, which her mother had also attended. Bashir then moved to Sydney to live with her grandmother in order to attend. Upon graduating in 1947, Bashir studied at the Sydney Conservatorium of Music, becoming a proficient violinist.

She completed the degrees of Bachelor of Medicine and Bachelor of Surgery (MBBS) in 1956 at the University of Sydney Medical School, residing at The Women's College from 1950 to 1955. In 1959, she was elected to the College Council, became Honorary Secretary in 1960 and was Chair from 1982 to 1990. She took up life membership of the College Union in 1969. While at university, she met rising rugby player, Nicholas Shehadie, to whom she was married on 23 February 1957, in St Philip's Church, Sydney, by Felix Arnott, then the Warden of St Paul's College, University of Sydney. They had their first child, Michael, in 1959, followed by two daughters, Susan and Alexandra.

Medical career

Upon her graduation in medicine, Bashir took up a posting as a junior resident medical officer at St Vincent's Hospital and then to the Royal Alexandra Hospital for Children. After first living in Elizabeth Bay, Bashir and Shehadie moved their family to Pendle Hill in Western Sydney, where Bashir worked as a General Practitioner. However, wanting to assist people suffering from mental illnesses, Bashir eventually decided to take up postgraduate studies in Psychiatry. To make this easier, Bashir and her family moved back into central Sydney to Mosman on the North Shore.

When Shehadie was made Lord Mayor of Sydney, Bashir became the Lady Mayoress of Sydney from 1973 to 1975. In 1974 Bashir was named as "Mother of the Year" by the NSW Child Care Committee and the National Council of Women (NSW), with Bashir noting "the fact that I, as a professional woman, was chosen as Mother of the Year points to the growing social acceptance of a working mother". When Shehadie was knighted in 1976, Bashir acquired the title Lady Shehadie, a title she did not use, remaining "Marie Bashir" in professional life. After completion of postgraduate studies in psychiatry, she was made a Member of the Royal Australian and New Zealand College of Psychiatrists in 1971, becoming a Fellow in 1980. From 1972, Bashir was a teacher, lecturer and mentor to medical students at The University of Sydney.

In 1972 Bashir was appointed Director of the Rivendell Child, Adolescent and Family Service, which provides consultative services for young people with emotional and psychiatric issues, and oversaw the unit's moving to the former Thomas Walker Convalescent Hospital in Concord West in 1977 following its acquisition by the NSW Health Commission in 1976. In 1987 she was appointed director of the Community Health Services in the Central Sydney Area Health Service, which put emphasis on early childhood services, migrant and Indigenous health as well as the elderly. On 13 June 1988 she was made an Officer of the Order of Australia (AO) "In recognition of service to medicine, particularly in the field of adolescent mental health".

From 1990 to 1992, she served on the New South Wales Women's Advisory Council. In 1993, she was appointed as Clinical Professor of Psychiatry at the University of Sydney, and in 1994 as the Clinical Director of Mental Health Services for the Central Sydney Area. This was a time of major reform in mental health service delivery, which contributed to substantial change in the provision of public sector mental health services. She served until 2001. In her university role, Bashir is instrumental in developing collaborative teaching programs between colleagues in Vietnam and Thailand with Australian psychiatrists, chairing the University of New South Wales Third World Health Group (1995–2000) and supporting various financial and social support programmes for International students.

In 1995, in a partnership with the Aboriginal Medical Service, Redfern, she established the Aboriginal Mental Health Unit, which provides regular clinics and counselling at both the Aboriginal Medical Service in Sydney and mainstream centres. From 1996, Bashir also took up the consultative role of senior psychiatrist to the Aboriginal Medical Service. As well as championing the health of indigenous Australians, Bashir also continued her focus on youth and juvenile issues, particularly through her terms chairing the NSW Juvenile Justice Advisory Council (1991–1999) and as consultative psychiatrist to Juvenile Justice Facilities (1993–2000). On 1 January 2001, Bashir was awarded the Centenary Medal.

Governor of NSW, other roles and honours

In early 2001, on the recommendation of Premier Bob Carr, Elizabeth II, Queen of Australia, appointed Bashir Governor of New South Wales, making her the state's first female governor, and the first governor of any Australian state of Lebanese descent. She was sworn in on 1 March 2001, and on 30 March she was appointed a Companion of the Order of Australia (AC). Upon her appointment, Sydney Morning Herald journalist David Marr noted, "what could be more valuable behind the scenes in Macquarie St than this woman's unique expertise with troubled adolescents?" Bashir's appointment was welcomed by both sides of politics and commended in a Sydney Morning Herald editorial as "an inspired choice" as well as noting that Bashir would be "a powerful advocate for the powerless".

In that role, Bashir departed from past practice. For Indigenous Australians, Bashir launched a health initiative to support Indigenous medicine and nursing students as well as supporting the progress of reconciliation. On the very day of her inauguration, Bashir agreed to become Patron of the Gay and Lesbian Counselling Service, which addresses mental and social issues in the LGBT community. This was the first time a NSW governor had supported a gay organisation. In 2005 Bashir opened the Sydney Gay and Lesbian Mardi Gras Festival in a concert in Hyde Park and credited the event with fostering "that sense of freedom which springs from the considerable diversity within our society – diversity of race, religion, culture and also sexual orientation [...] We must never take these things for granted because most of you would agree that across the world today an extraordinary winding back to many previously discarded attitudes is taking place, not only affecting gay and lesbian groups, but women's health and many aspects of social justice".

In 2002, Bashir became Patron of the Australia-Vietnam Medical Trust and became intimately involved in collaborative health programs in Vietnam, particularly in rural areas. On 17 May 2001, the Governor-General, Sir William Deane, invested Bashir as a Dame of Grace of the Most Venerable Order of the Hospital of St John of Jerusalem (DStJ). Having previously studied violin at the Conservatorium of Music, Sydney, in 2002 Bashir was asked to become the Patron of the Sydney University Graduate Choir. She is also a Patron of Opera Australia, the Sydney Symphony Orchestra, Sydney Philharmonia Choirs, Pinchgut Opera and the Australian Archaeological Institute at Athens.

In 2003 Bashir received the Mental Health Princess Award, awarded by Princess Galyani Vadhana of Thailand, for contribution to collaborative mental health programs between Australia and Thailand, and in 2004 she was recognised as an Australian Living Treasure. In 2004 she was made an honorary Member of the United Nations Development Fund for Women (UNIFEM). In March 2004, during a visit to Lebanon, Bashir was appointed a Grand Officer of the National Order of the Cedar by General Emile Lahoud, President of the Republic of Lebanon. On 14 September, Premier Carr announced that he would recommend to the Queen that Bashir's term be extended for another three years. Buckingham Palace confirmed his recommendation on 1 October saying that: "The Queen is content for Her Excellency Professor Marie Bashir AC, to remain in her current position until February 2008 as recommended."

On 31 March 2006, the Queen appointed her a Commander of the Royal Victorian Order (CVO). Bashir was involved in the high-profile legal case against a psychiatrist called Dr Brendan O' Sullivan and the NSW health service, in which she was falsely cited in his dismissal; using the opportunity to claim sovereign immunity, usually only used by the Crown.

In April 2007 Bashir was elected by the University Senate to take up a four-year appointment as Chancellor of the University of Sydney on 1 June 2007. It was announced on 15 October 2007 that the Queen, on the recommendation of Premier Morris Iemma, had extended Bashir's appointment as governor for a further four years to February 2012. On 4 November 2009, she was invested as a Chevalier of the Ordre National de la Légion d'Honneur by the then President of France, Nicolas Sarkozy, and presented by the Ambassador of France to Australia, Michel Filhol.

As the longest-serving incumbent state governor, Bashir held a dormant commission to act as the Administrator of the Commonwealth when the Governor-General of Australia was absent from Australia. She held the position of Administrator many times: from 10 to 17 July 2007, 30 September to 12 October 2007, and 20 April to 4 May 2008 in the absence of Michael Jeffery, and from 30 July to 6 August 2008, 5 to 19 November 2008, 17 March to 2 April 2009, and 7 to 12 June 2010, in the absence of Quentin Bryce.

In May–June 2010, the New South Wales Government experienced a series of resignations: Karyn Paluzzano over expenses abuse, David Campbell over a personal scandal, Ian Macdonald over expenses abuse and Graham West's retirement. These were widely seen as highlighting the NSW Government's inability to govern effectively and in response to this there were various calls for Bashir to take action as governor and dismiss the government. She played down these calls in a radio interview on 10 June, saying that:

In late 2010, Mosman Municipal Council decided to name the new sports centre in Rawson Park for Bashir in recognition of her service to both New South Wales and the Mosman community. She officially opened the "Marie Bashir Mosman Sports Centre" on 10 December 2010 with the Mayor, Anne Connon. On 14 September 2011, Liberal Premier Barry O'Farrell announced that he had recommended to the Queen that Bashir's term be extended for another two years to 2014, which had been accepted: "Over the past 10 years the Governor's caring nature, her genuine interest in local communities and her extraordinary work rate have endeared her to people everywhere...Because of her diverse background, career and interests, Professor Bashir has given a historic and important post a contemporary relevance and resonance."

From the time of her commencement as governor, Bashir, like her immediate predecessor, did not reside in Government House, Sydney, retaining it for reception and official purposes. However, in October 2011, the new Premier Barry O'Farrell announced that the Bashir had agreed with O'Farrell's offer to move back into Government House: "A lot of people believe the Governor should live at Government House. That's what it was built for ... [A]t some stage a rural or regional governor will be appointed and we will need to provide accommodation at Government House so it makes sense to provide appropriate living areas". However, because Government House has not been a residence for fifteen years, O'Farrell also announced that the Bashir would initially move into a smaller adjacent building, called the chalet, while refurbishments of the main wing occur, with a proposed move into the main house "before Christmas".

On 19 April 2012, Bashir was presented with the insignia of a Grand Cordon of the National Order of the Cedar by the President of Lebanon, General Michel Suleiman, at Government House, Sydney, during his state visit to Australia. At a meeting of the University of Sydney Senate in May 2012, Bashir announced her intention to retire as Chancellor. At a ceremony marking her retirement as Chancellor, her portrait depicting Bashir as Chancellor by Shen Jiawei was unveiled, to hang in the Great Hall. Also in April, it was announced that Bashir's term as governor, which had been expected to expire in February 2014, had been extended another six months to September 2014, at which Bashir expressed her intention to retire.

On  26 May 2013, Bashir was promoted to the rank of Officer within the Ordre National de la Légion d'Honneur by the then President of France, François Hollande, and invested with the insignia at a ceremony at Government House Sydney by Général Regis Outtier, Secretary General of the Society of the Légion d'Honneur.

On 21 October 2013 Premier O'Farrell and the Minister for Education Adrian Piccoli announced that the new state primary school in Strathfield on the old site of the Sydney Adventist College would be named the "Marie Bashir Public School" in her honour. At the announcement O'Farrell noted that: "Naming this school after Professor Bashir honours her outstanding contribution to NSW and is a reminder that she achieved all her distinctions after being educated at public schools – from Narrandera Public School to Sydney Girls High School". On 28 November 2013 the Premier of NSW announced that the Queen had given approval for the title of "The Honourable" to be accorded to the governors and former governors of New South Wales.

On 5 December 2013, the University of Sydney decided to rename the Sydney Emerging Infections and Biosecurity Institute in her honour to become the Marie Bashir Institute for Infectious Diseases and Biosecurity (MBI). Also in December 2013, Bashir became patron of the NAISDA Foundation.

In the 2014 Queen's Birthday Honours, Bashir was made a Dame of the Order of Australia "For extraordinary and pre-eminent achievement and merit in service to the administration, public life, and people of New South Wales, to medicine, particularly as an advocate for improved mental health outcomes for the young, marginalised and disadvantaged, to international relations, through the promotion of collaborative health programs, and as a leader in tertiary education".

In September 2014, her official portrait as governor by Archibald Prize finalist Mathew Lynn was unveiled at Government House by Premier Mike Baird.

Retirement
Ahead of her impending retirement from office on 1 October, Bashir noted that the time was right for her to go just short of the record in office set by Sir Roden Cutler: "a war hero who lost a leg serving this country, I would like to think of him as the longest serving governor" and that "The time is right, It was myself who said I would conclude my term around the anniversary of World War One. That would mean that I would not exceed the longest term of Sir Roden Cutler for whom I had the greatest admiration and respect".

Continuing roles
She made clear at the time of her retirement her interest in continuing her community work, particularly through the area of post-traumatic stress disorder in Australian Defence Force veterans.  Bashir is one of three patrons of the Australian Indigenous Education Foundation. Her role as patron of the NAISDA Foundation continues .

Titles, styles and honours

Titles

Bashir's style and title as governor in full was: Her Excellency Professor The Honourable Dame Marie Bashir, Dame of the Order of Australia, Commander of the Royal Victorian Order, Governor of the State of New South Wales in the Commonwealth of Australia.

Honours

National and international

State

Appointments
  1980 Fellow of the Royal Australian and New Zealand College of Psychiatrists (FRANZCP).
  2004 Honorary Member of the United Nations Development Fund for Women.
  2006 Honorary Fellow of the Australian Academy of Technological Sciences and Engineering (Hon.FTSE).
  2007 Honorary Member of the Australian Medical Association.

Honorary degrees
  3 May 2002: Honorary Doctorate of the University (D.Univ.) by the Australian Catholic University.
  11 October 2002: Honorary Doctor of Medicine (MD) by the University of Sydney.
  13 November 2004: Honorary Doctorate of the University (D.Univ.) by Southern Cross University at its Lismore Campus.
  2004: Honorary Doctor of Science (D.Sc.) by the University of New South Wales.
  2007: Honorary Doctor of Science (D.Sc.) by the University of Wollongong.
  20 April 2012: Honorary Doctorate of the University (D.Univ.) by Macquarie University.
  17 April 2014: Honorary Doctor of Letters (D.Litt.) by the University of Western Sydney.

Honorary appointments
  1 March 2001: Honorary and Regimental Colonel in the Royal New South Wales Regiment.
  1 March 2001: Honorary Air Commodore of No. 22 Squadron Royal Australian Air Force.
  9 October 2008: Honorary Commodore, Navy Warfare Training, Royal Australian Navy.
  22 August 2014: Honorary Governor of the New South Wales Police Force.

Honorific eponyms
Awards
Marie Bashir Peace Awards, National Council of Women of New South Wales.

Institutions and buildings
Marie Bashir Mosman Sports Centre, Mosman.
Marie Bashir Public School, Strathfield.
Marie Bashir Institute for Infectious Diseases and Biosecurity (MBI), University of Sydney.
Governor Marie Bashir Reading Room, State Library of New South Wales.
Professor Marie Bashir Centre, Royal Prince Alfred Hospital, Camperdown.

References

Citations

Sources

Publications

External links 

 Governor of New South Wales official website
 University of Sydney – Chancellor Marie Bashir
 Photo: Bashir with RADM Nigel Coates, Commander Australian Fleet, at 2009 RAN Fleet Review.
 Photo: Bashir as Honorary Colonel
 Photo: Bashir with ADCs at ANZAC Day 2008.
 

1930 births
Living people
Australian healthcare managers
Australian Maronites
Australian people of Lebanese descent
Australian psychiatrists
Australian women psychiatrists
Australian Commanders of the Royal Victorian Order
Chancellors of the University of Sydney
Dames of the Order of Australia
Dames of Grace of the Order of St John
Fellows of the Australian Academy of Technological Sciences and Engineering
Grand Cordons of the National Order of the Cedar
Governors of New South Wales
Honorary air commodores of the Royal Australian Air Force
Officiers of the Légion d'honneur
People educated at Sydney Girls High School
Recipients of the Centenary Medal
Spouses of Australian politicians
Sydney Medical School alumni
Academic staff of the University of Sydney